Sergei Andreyevich Bobrovsky (born 20 September 1988) is a Russian professional ice hockey goaltender for the Florida Panthers of the National Hockey League (NHL). He has also played in the NHL for the Philadelphia Flyers and Columbus Blue Jackets, with whom he became recognized as one of the NHL's top goaltenders. Nicknamed "Bob", Bobrovsky is a two-time Vezina Trophy winner, winning in the 2012–13 and 2016–17 seasons while a member of the Blue Jackets.

Playing career

Philadelphia Flyers (2010–2012)

Bobrovsky was never drafted into the NHL. Philadelphia Flyers general manager Paul Holmgren has said that the Flyers considered drafting him during the 2006 NHL Entry Draft, but ultimately decided not to given the difficulty of signing Russian players at the time. After playing his first four professional seasons with Metallurg Novokuznetsk in Russia, Bobrovsky signed a three-year, entry-level contract with the Flyers on 6 May 2010. He was initially slated to begin his North American career with the American Hockey League (AHL)'s Adirondack Phantoms, but after impressing coaches during training camp, Bobrovsky replaced the injured starter Michael Leighton on the roster. After Leighton recovered, Bobrovsky continued to share goaltending duties with Brian Boucher.

Flyers head coach Peter Laviolette named Bobrovsky the starting goaltender for the opening game of the 2010–11 season against the Pittsburgh Penguins on 7 October 2010. In his NHL debut, Bobrovsky picked up a 3–2 win and was named the game's first star in the first regular season game at Pittsburgh's Consol Energy Center. At 22 years and 17 days, he became the youngest goaltender to win a season-opening game for the Flyers, eclipsing Ron Hextall, who started at 22 years and 159 days on 9 October 1986. Bobrovsky was also the first Flyers rookie goaltender to win his NHL debut since Antero Niittymäki did so in 2004. Bobrovsky enjoyed a successful rookie season, posting a 28–13–8 record along with a .915 save percentage. However, after a disappointing showing during the playoffs in which he was often benched in favour of backup Brian Boucher, the Flyers signed Ilya Bryzgalov to a nine-year contract to be their new starting goaltender.

Columbus Blue Jackets (2012–2019)
After a season backing-up Bryzgalov, on 22 June 2012, Bobrovsky was traded to the Columbus Blue Jackets in exchange for Columbus' second-round draft pick in the 2012 NHL Entry Draft (used to select Anthony Stolarz), a fourth-round pick in the 2012 NHL Entry Draft (used to select Taylor Leier) and the Phoenix Coyotes' fourth-round pick in the 2013 NHL Entry Draft (used to select Justin Auger).

As a result of the 2012–13 NHL lockout, Bobrovsky signed a contract with SKA Saint Petersburg of the Kontinental Hockey League (KHL), but returned to the Blue Jackets when the lockout finished. After splitting time early in the season, Bobrovsky supplanted Steve Mason as Columbus' starting goaltender; it was Bobrovsky's first time as a starter since his rookie season in Philadelphia. Bobrovsky was instrumental in the Blue Jackets' push for a playoff spot, which ultimately came up just short as the team finished in ninth place in the Western Conference. Despite this, Bobrovsky had 21 wins, and career bests of a 2.00 goals against average (GAA) and a .932 save percentage. With this performance, he was awarded the Vezina Trophy, awarded to the league's top goaltender during the regular season.

On 1 July 2013, Bobrovsky signed a two-year, $11.25 million contract extension with the Blue Jackets. On 3 July 2013, he was named to the NHL first All-Star team.

On 3 December 2013, Bobrovsky was injured in a game against the Tampa Bay Lightning and would be out for four-to-five weeks. He returned to action on 6 January 2014, against the New York Rangers, earning a shootout victory by the score of 4–3. Bobrovsky also made a robbing glove save in the shootout on former Blue Jackets forward star Rick Nash, which was considered to be the game-saving save.

Bobrovsky backstopped the Blue Jackets in the 2014 playoffs, where they played the Pittsburgh Penguins in the Eastern Conference quarter-finals. On 19 April 2014, the Blue Jackets won their first playoff game in franchise history in Game 2 of the series, 4–3, followed by their second-ever playoff victory, in Game 4. Bobrovsky played well in Game 5, saving 48 of 50 shots for a 0.960 save percentage, although the Blue Jackets lost the game 3–1. The Blue Jackets were ultimately eliminated in Game 6 on 28 April, losing 4–3.

During the 2016–17 season, Bobrovsky posted a record of 41–17–5, good enough for second in the league while also setting a Blue Jackets franchise record for wins in a season by a goaltender. He also posted a 2.06 GAA, .931 save percentage (both of which led the league among qualifying goaltenders) and recorded seven shutouts (third in the league). He, along with the Washington Capitals' Braden Holtby, were the only goaltenders in the league to be in the top-five in each goaltender statistic category. For his efforts, Bobrovsky was rewarded with his second Vezina Trophy. However, Bobrovsky's regular season success did not carry over to the 2017 playoffs—in a 4–1 series loss to the Pittsburgh Penguins, Bobrovsky won only one game, posting a 3.88 GAA and .882 save percentage.

A 37–22–6 record during the 2017–18 season was once again good enough to propel the Blue Jackets to a playoff spot. They faced the Washington Capitals in the first round, falling in six games. Bobrovsky posted a 3.18 goals-against-average during the playoffs.

The Blue Jackets qualified for the postseason the next year behind Bobrovsky's 37 wins. The Blue Jackets upset the Presidents' Trophy-winning Tampa Bay Lightning, sweeping them in four games. The win marked the first series win in franchise history. They faced the Boston Bruins in the second round, falling in six games. Bobrovsky posted a 2.41 goals against average and .925 save percentage during the playoffs.

Florida Panthers (2019–present)
On 1 July 2019, Bobrovsky signed a seven-year, $70 million contract with the Florida Panthers. On 10 February 2020, Bobrovsky played his 500th NHL game as the Panthers lost 4–1 to the Philadelphia Flyers. He struggled through a down year, posting a record of 23–16–9 through 50 games in the 2019–20 regular season before the COVID-19 shutdown. His 3.23 GAA and .900 save percentage were both his worst since 2011–12, his last year before joining the Blue Jackets. Bobrovsky started all four games of the 2020 Stanley Cup playoffs Qualifying Round against the New York Islanders, allowing 12 goals as the Panthers dropped the series to the Islanders 3–1.

International play

Bobrovsky participated in the 2007 Super Series, an eight-game series between Canadian and Russian juniors commemorating the 35th anniversary of the 1972 Summit Series, and garnered the most ice-time of any goaltender. At the end of that year, he played in the 2008 World Junior Ice Hockey Championships, backstopping Russia to a bronze medal.

Bobrovsky was named as one of Russia's goaltender for the 2014 Winter Olympics in Sochi; he and Semyon Varlamov split time tending the net. After a disappointing loss in a shootout to the United States, the Russian team would end up being eliminated from the tournament by Finland with a 3–1 loss; Bobrovsky saw some action after Varlamov was pulled in the game.

Bobrovsky participated in the 2014 IIHF World Championship in Belarus as Russia's starting goaltender. In his first game, he saved all 27 shots, shutting-out Switzerland 5–0. Russia won a berth in the IIHF Finals against Finland, who eliminated Russia from the Sochi Olympics. Bobrovsky faced-off against fellow NHL goaltender Pekka Rinne of the Nashville Predators in the gold medal game. Russia went on to win the gold medal game 5–2, with Bobrovsky saving 24 out of 26 shots, backstopping the Russians to their second gold medal in the past three years in the tournament.

Bobrovsky was named the starting goaltender of Russia for the 2015 IIHF World Championship. On 9 May, he saved 13 shots including a penalty shot against Belarus in the group stage to help his team to a 7–0 win. On 16 May in the semifinal, Bobrovsky made several outstanding saves against the U.S., and led his team to a 4–0 win. He eventually finished with 35 saves and was named Player of the game for Team Russia. On 17 May, he allowed 6 goals on 37 shots in the final, and although he made some great saves early on, it was not enough to keep his team from losing 6–1 to Canada.

Personal life
Bobrovsky married Olya Dorokova on 16 August 2011. Bobrovsky's nicknames are "Bob", "Officer Bobrovsky", and "The Number One Cop."

On 13 March 2020, Bobrovsky pledged to give $100,000 to part-time workers of the BB&T Center who were unable to work during the suspension of the 2019–20 NHL season because of the 2020 coronavirus pandemic.

Records and achievements

Government

 "Badge of Merit for the Town of Novokuznetsk" (21 June 2013) – presented by acting mayor of Novokuznetsk Sergey Kuznetsov
 Order of Honor (27 May 2014) – presented by the President of Russia Vladimir Putin for the victory at the 2014 IIHF World Championship as member of Russia men's national ice hockey team
 "Order of Honor of Kuzbass" (3 июня 2014) – presented by governor of Kemerovo Oblast Aman Tuleyev for the skills and professionalism in sports activities

NHL
 NHL All Star selection: 2015, 2017
 NHL Rookie of the Month: November 2010
NHL's First Star of the Week: Weeks ending 10 March 2013, 14 April 2013, 16 March 2014, 31 March 2019
NHL's Second Star of the Week: Week ending 6 March 2017
NHL's Third Star of the Week: Week ending 17 March 2013
NHL's First Star of the Month: December 2016
NHL's Second Star of the Month: March 2017, March 2019
NHL's Third Star of the Month: March 2013 
 Shares record for most consecutive wins in one NHL regular season – 14 (November 29, 2016 to January 3, 2017)

Columbus Blue Jackets
 Most wins in a season: 41 (2016–17) 
 Best goals against average in a season: 2.00 (2012–13) 
 Best save percentage: .932 (2012–13)

Career statistics

Regular season and playoffs
Bold indicates led league

International

Awards and honors

† Could not play due to injury.

References

Further reading

External links

 

1988 births
Living people
Columbus Blue Jackets players
Florida Panthers players
Ice hockey players at the 2014 Winter Olympics
Kuznetskie Medvedi players
Metallurg Novokuznetsk players
National Hockey League All-Stars
Olympic ice hockey players of Russia
People from Novokuznetsk
Philadelphia Flyers players
Russian ice hockey goaltenders
Russian expatriate ice hockey people
Russian expatriate sportspeople in the United States
SKA Saint Petersburg players
Undrafted National Hockey League players
Vezina Trophy winners
Sportspeople from Kemerovo Oblast